English rule may refer to:
English rule (attorney's fees), a common use of the term
Golden rule (law), also known as British rule or English rule, a rule of statutory construction

See also
American rule (disambiguation)
British Rule (disambiguation)